Radioanatomy (x-ray anatomy) is anatomy discipline which involves the study of anatomy through the use of radiographic films. 
The x-ray film represents two-dimensional image of a three-dimensional object due to the summary projection of different anatomical structures  onto a planar surface.

It requires certain skills for the correct interpretation of such images. Radiological anatomy is a necessary component of training for radiologists as well as medical students.

References

External links 
  RadAnatomy: The KU Radiographic Anatomy Program

Radiography
Human anatomy